Adam Walinsky (born 1937) is a lawyer who served in the United States Department of Justice and as a speechwriter for Robert F. Kennedy. He had also been the 1970 nominee for New York Attorney General by the Democratic Party. He criticized Ira Stoll's efforts to claim John F. Kennedy as a political conservative saying that Kennedy had moved to the Left near the end of his life. In 2016 he endorsed Donald Trump in large part due to concerns the Democratic Party had become too supportive of war.

References 

New York (state) Democrats
American speechwriters
1937 births
Living people